Vickey Ray Anderson is a former running back in the National Football League, Canadian Football League and United States Football League.

Biography
Anderson was born on May 3, 1956, in Oklahoma City, Oklahoma.

Career
Anderson played for the Green Bay Packers during the 1980 NFL season. He played at the collegiate level at the University of Oklahoma. While there, he had played as a cornerback.

See also
List of Green Bay Packers players

References

1956 births
Sportspeople from Oklahoma City
Green Bay Packers players
New Jersey Generals players
American football running backs
American football cornerbacks
University of Oklahoma alumni
Oklahoma Sooners football players
Living people
Players of American football from Oklahoma